The Agreement on Internal Trade (AIT) entered into force on July 1, 1995, and includes government departments, agencies, commissions and Crown corporations of the 10 Canadian provinces, the three territories and the federal government.

The Agreement on Internal Trade is an intergovernmental agreement between the federal government and the provinces and territories to reduce and eliminate barriers to free movement of people, goods, services and investments within Canada. Under the Agreement, these governments have agreed to apply the principles of non-discrimination, transparency, openness and accessibility with respect to their procurement opportunities and those of their municipalities and municipal organizations, school boards and publicly funded academic, health and social services entities. The Agreement covers only those tenders where the procurement value exceeds a specified amount.

Currently, the thresholds require that all institutions in the MASH sector (Municipal/Academic/Social Services/Healthcare) tender for public bidding contracts worth $100,000 or more, or in the case of construction, $250,000 or more. The agreement mandates the "equal" treatment of people, goods and services anywhere in Canada. That means businesses in any province or territory are to be considered for procurement bids, eliminating "buy local" policies. There are some exceptions in the deal. Provinces or municipalities can still designate sole-source suppliers in particular circumstances. Its ultimate goal is to eliminate barriers to trade, investments and product mobility.

See also
Canada Minister for Internal Trade
New West Partnership
Single market
Internal Market (European Union)

External links
 AIT Introduction
 Text of the Agreement and subsequent protocols of amendment
 Canada’s Problem: Domestic Trade Barriers

1995 in Canadian law
Economy of Canada
Economic history of Canada
Federalism in Canada